Hồ Văn Châm (Chữ Hán: 胡文箴; 9 July 1932 - 31 July 2013), also known as Minh Vũ, was a South Vietnamese physician and official, who served as minister of Chieu Hoi and minister of veteran affairs. After the fall of the Republic of Vietnam in 1975, he was sent to the re-education camp and moved to Canada after being released.

Biography 
Hồ Văn Châm was born on 9 July 1932 in the village of Phước Tích, Thừa Thiên Province, central Vietnam.

Châm joined the Nationalist Party of Greater Vietnam in 1955. In 1969, he was appointed commissioner general of the Central Executive Committee of the Nationalist Party of Greater Vietnam.

Châm died in Ottawa, Canada, on 31 July 2013 at the age of 82.

Personal life 
Hồ Văn Châm was a Buddhist with a Dharma name Nguyên Minh. His wife was from Quảng Ngãi province. The couple had seven children.

Publications 

 Les Relations Alimentaires dans les Corps de Troupes au Vietnam, doctoral thesis, Faculty of Medicine, Saigon, 1962
 Nutrition situation in Vietnam, 1965

Medals 

  National Order, Five Class
  Health Medal, First Class
  Rural Development Medal
  Ethnic Development Medal, First Class
  Army Medal, Second Class
  Honor Medal, First Class
  Air Service Medal, Honor Class
  Medal of the 1960 Operations
  Military Bearing Medal, Third Class
  Military Service Medal, Third Class

Source:

References

External links 

 Chương trình Chiêu Hồi của Việt Nam Cộng Hòa
 THE CHIEU HOI PROGRAM OF VIETNAM

1932 births
2013 deaths
Vietnamese Buddhists